María Gertrudis Hore (1742–1801) was a Spanish poet.

Life and career 
She began as a socialite of Irish immigrant parents. In 1762 she married and then sixteen years after that she became a nun. In the convent she wrote poetry and became known as the "Daughter of the Sun" for her renown. Friendship among women is a theme in some of her works. She has also been described as self-referential and, despite being a nun, occasionally erotic in poetry. Additionally she has been of interest as a woman who produced Spanish Enlightenment literature, although some of her work is more similar to Romanticism.

Notable work
A poet in search of freedom and Maria Gertrudis Hore Law (1742-1801)

References 

18th-century Spanish writers
People from Cádiz
1742 births
1801 deaths
Spanish women poets
18th-century Spanish women writers
Spanish people of Irish descent
18th-century Spanish nuns